Mitchell Quilleon Brown, known by his stage name Kid Quill, is an American rapper from Shelbyville, Indiana. The name Kid Quill originates from his middle name Quilleon with the addition of Kid to the beginning. He made his first notable appearance with his 2016 album The Name Above The Title.

 Soccer career 
While attending Shelbyville Senior High School, Brown was a 3-time Hoosier Heritage All-Conference First Team, 2-time Indiana Soccer Coaches Association Top Team Player Awards, 2-time Indiana All-District First Team, 3-time Top Drawer Soccer Player to Watch, 2-time Indianapolis Star Super Team, 2011 Indiana All-State 3rd Team Selection, and 2012 NSCAA Soccer All-American Scholar.

He decided to continue his soccer career by playing for DePauw University at the collegiate level. He had three appearances in his freshman year, including playing in the NCAA Tournament, and two in his sophomore year.

His junior year, Brown decided to quit soccer because the balance of music, soccer, and school was too much.

 Music career 
While in high school, Brown would rap battle friends in his basement. One of his friends decided to record Brown rapping and uploaded it to YouTube where it received a good number of views. Noticing that there was potential, he decided to pursue rapping.

On October 14, 2016, Brown released his debut album The Name Above The Title. It charted Top 10 on iTunes Hip-Hop/Rap. It also charted as a Billboard Heatseaker.

In September 2017, Brown followed his first album with 94.3 The Reel. This also charted Top 10 on iTunes Hip-Hop/Rap Charts. He spent the following year as support on nationals tours with Devvon Terrell, SoMo, Skizzy Mars and Bryce Vine.

On September 6, 2019, Brown released his fourth album, titled Sunset Diner, inspired by his adolescence, 80s and 90s music and his life experiences.

On September 25, September 26 and September 27th 2020, Brown opened for Quinn XCII and Chelsea Cutler at their drive in shows at Charlotte Motor Speedway and The Westland Mall.

 Discography 

 Albums 
  Ear to Ear (2014)
 The Name Above The Title (2016)
  94.3 The Reel (2017)
  Sunset Diner (2019)

 Singles 

 So Good (Remix) (2017)
 Weatherman (2018)
 Kids in the Summer (2018)
 Rain, Rain (2018)
 90's kids (2021)
 Curbside (2021)
 1br apt (2021)Mood ring'' (2021)
 Greener (2021)

As featuring artist 
 "IOU" (EMAN8 featuring Kid Quill) (2019)
"No Drama" (Two Friends featuring Kid Quill and New Beat Fund) (2020)

References 

Living people
American male rappers
Rappers from Indiana
Midwest hip hop musicians
21st-century American singers
People from Shelbyville, Indiana
1994 births
21st-century American rappers
21st-century American male singers